Skogstorp is a suburb of Falkenberg in Falkenberg Municipality, Halland County, Sweden. Until 2015 it was considered a separate locality, with 2,124 inhabitants in 2010.

References 

Populated places in Falkenberg Municipality